Robert Stoker is a Community Worker in South Belfast and former senior UK Independence Party and Ulster Unionist Party member in Belfast. Stoker is a former long-serving Belfast City councillor, former Lord Mayor of Belfast and a former member of the Northern Ireland Forum for South Belfast.

Biography
As a member of the Ulster Unionist Party, Stoker was elected to the Northern Ireland Forum for Belfast South in May 1996. He had already been elected as a councillor to represent the Balmoral electoral area in a by-election in May 1995. He was re-elected in May 1997, June 2001 and June 2005 and 2011.

He was elected Deputy Lord Mayor of the city in June 1998 and Lord Mayor of Belfast in June 1999.

He contested the Belfast South constituency in the 2007 Northern Ireland Assembly election, but was unsuccessful, finishing 9th out of 18 candidates with 1,122 votes, 3.7% of the total first preference votes cast.

Alderman Stoker, by then one of Belfast's longest serving councillors, left the Ulster Unionist Party in October 2014 to join UKIP. He cited wanting to be "part of a national party" and claimed that the old unionist parties were neglecting the very people on the ground who elected them. He contested the 2015 general election for UKIP in South Belfast finishing 7th with 1900 votes (4.9% of the total share).

In 2015, Stoker was appointed as Vice Chairman of UKIP in Northern Ireland by the local membership of the party. In 2017, Stoker retired from active politics to focus on his work as a Community Worker in South Belfast.

References

Living people
Ulster Unionist Party councillors
Members of Belfast City Council
Lord Mayors of Belfast
Members of the Northern Ireland Forum
UK Independence Party politicians
Year of birth missing (living people)